The Wolves of Mercy Falls is a series of four novels, located in the genres of romance, fantasy and young adult (YA) fiction, written by number one bestselling author Maggie Stiefvater. Published by American multinational company Scholastic from between 2009 and 2014, the series consists of the titles Shiver (published 1 August 2009), Linger (published 13 July 2010), Forever (published 12 July 2011) and Sinner (published 1 July 2014). Set in the fictional town of Mercy Falls, Stiefvater has stated that the real town of Ely in Minnesota would be its closest neighbouring destination, with the two towns sharing a similar climate.

The novels largely follow the relationship of Grace Brisbane and Samuel K. “Sam” Roth, as tensions between humans and wolves/werewolves rise throughout the small town of Mercy Falls, in the wake of the attack of a school boy.

Shiver (2009), the first book in the Shiver trilogy, is written from the alternating perspectives of both Grace and Sam. The second book, Linger (2010), includes the perspectives of Isabel Culpeper and Cole St Clair, alongside those of Grace and Sam. The final book in the Shiver Trilogy, Forever (2011), is written from Grace, Sam, Isabel and Cole's perspectives, with a small chapter of prologue from a werewolf named Shelby.

The fourth addition to The Wolves of Mercy Falls series, titled Sinner (2014), is a standalone book which closely follows the characters of Isabel Culpeper and Cole St Clair, set in the Southern California city of Los Angeles, as told from the perspectives of Isabel and Cole.

Stiefvater's Shiver remained on The New York Times (NYT) bestseller list for over 32 weeks in 2009, selling 130,996 copies. Since publication, it has been licensed in over 30 foreign territories. The second book in the series, Linger, debuted at number 1 on the NYT Bestseller list in 2010. There are more than 1.7 million copies of the Shiver trilogy in print.

Plot

Shiver
Shiver begins against the backdrop of winter, with the character of Grace Brisbane at age 11, who has been pulled from her backyard tire swing by a pack of wolves. Saved from their attack by a yellow-eyed wolf, the 6 years following consist of Grace routinely watching the edge of the woods behind her house in search of her saviour – he returns her gaze every winter. The perspective of the novel alternates between Grace and the yellow-eyed werewolf, Samuel K. “Sam” Roth, who only transforms over the duration of winter.

The death of Jack Culpeper, a student at Grace's school, spreads terror throughout the small community of Mercy Falls, as it is suspected that he has been killed by the wolves. This leads to the decision to hunt them, with Grace's attempt to deter the shooters resulting in her discovery of Sam, except now in human form. Having been shot, he had unwillingly transformed into his human state, recognisable to Grace only from his eyes.

Sam is taken to the hospital by Grace, receiving surgery to remove the bullet. As the two are finally left alone in the recovery unit, Sam awakens from the anaesthetic much earlier than anticipated, eventually recognising Grace. Sam explains to her that his healing abilities are a side-effect of being a werewolf, prompting them to escape, before the doctors discover him awake and with no visible wound.

Grace invites Sam to stay at her house following these events, who reluctantly agrees to sleep in her room, as they decide to hide his presence from her parents. Back at school, Grace's close friend Olivia Marx reveals that a wolf had been sighted outside the school the day prior. Its description matches that of the suspected newly transformed werewolf, Jack Culpeper.

Sam attempts to convince Grace that she must also be a werewolf, after having been attacked by the wolves as a child. At school, Isabel Culpeper tells Grace that she has seen her brother alive in the woods. Jack had told her that Grace could explain how he was alive, but to protect the pack, Grace lies and implies Isabel has gone mad.

Sam drives to the home of his adoptive farther, Geoffrey Beck, revealing that the pack all live there together over the summer months. Upon arriving at the house, Sam finds Beck and a van containing three newly turned werewolves. Disgusted that Beck would put others through the pain of transforming, he leaves.

The day after meeting Grace's parents, Sam rushes downstairs in the early morning to the scene of Grace being pinned against the kitchen cupboards by Shelby, a werewolf. Sam attacks the wolf, saving his girlfriend, but gaining an injury himself in the process.

At school, Isabel shows Grace a stack of Olivia's photos, containing two pictures of Jack, both as a wolf and as a human. Forced into revealing the pack's secrets, Grace invites Isabel over to her house, where she and Sam explain about the werewolves.

Sam finds Isabel and Jack in the woods, returning to the Culpeper mansion with them, discovering that Jack has been trying to find a cure to become human. Convinced that Grace had not transformed because of the existence of a cure, he decides to find her.

Waiting for Sam to pick her up from school, Grace climbs into her car before realising it is Jack behind the wheel. He tells her she must give him the cure to be human again, using Sam as leverage, who he has as hostage. Grace calls Beck, alerting him to the situation. The two arrive at Beck's house soon after.

Jack transforms into a wolf upon entering. Grace helps Beck to lock him in the bathroom, before calling Sam's mobile. He answers, saying he has been locked in a shed on the Culpeper's estate. Grace calls Isabel to help find him, as the temperature is about to drop, meaning Sam could transform. Isabel eventually finds him and brings him inside, saving him from the cold.

Grace comes to the conclusion that nearly dying from heat stroke as a child cured her, as Isabel suggests that the same effect could be mirrored by injecting Sam and Jack with meningitis. After they infect the two boys, Sam transforms into a wolf, vanishing into the woods.

Having not seen Sam in months, Grace finally finds him appearing at the edge of the woods behind her house, shockingly in human form. They embrace.

Linger
A newly recovered Sam finds Cole transforming in Beck's house and realises that he is one of the teenagers Beck had turned for the future of the pack. After becoming human again, Cole turns up at Isabel's house in search of clothes. To hide her grief over Jack, she ends up kissing him, but he disappears as a wolf again.

Grace becomes very sick and, when she cries in pain, her parents find Sam in her room. They take Grace to hospital and stop Sam from seeing her. After returning from hospital, Grace makes plans to go and live with Sam at Beck's house. She leaves home one night and Sam is ecstatic to see her.

Isabel and Sam find Cole having a fit and discover that he was experimenting with needles, trying to find a way to transition. Isabel and Cole later kiss again when he's warming up in the bath and again when visiting her mother's clinic. After spending a day together, during which Cole admits his famous past to her, they almost sleep together until Cole rejects her, not believing he is good enough for her.

When Grace's health worsens, Sam and Cole take her to the hospital where her father punches Sam. Cole realises that, because Grace was bitten but didn't change in a set amount of time, she's dying. He eventually comes to the conclusion that she needs to turn.

Isabel shows up and creates a distraction to get Grace's parents out of the room. Cole then gives Grace his DNA and she shifts, escaping out the window. Sam states that he will find a cure, and then he will find Grace.

Forever
Shelby finds Olivia and kills her. Grace turns into a human and manages to call Sam, but by the time he arrives for her, she has already turned back. A desperate Cole tries to call Isabel but since she's still upset at his rejection, he leaves 20 voicemails on her machine.

Grace is chased into a sinkhole by Shelby. Sam and Cole find her and manage to save her, locking her in the bathroom until she can change back. Isabel is shocked to discover that her father is arranging for the wolves to be removed from the protected species list.

Cole reads Beck's diaries and discovers that the wolves have been moved once before, when Hannah, a wolf who could retain her human memories in wolf form, lead them.

Sam is interrogated by Officer Koenig as he is the suspect to be behind the death and possible rape (as she was found naked) of Olivia, and Grace's disappearance. Sam and Grace tell him about the wolves and he tells them that he owns land just outside Mercy Falls where the wolves would be safe.

Grace visits her parents to say goodbye, but they have replaced her with a cat. Cole captures Beck and calls Sam and Grace. He injects Beck with a substance he has made, despite Sam's protests, and it turns Beck human again. They tell him that Sam was successfully cured but they have to move the wolves.

Beck tells them about Hannah and turns back into a wolf, agreeing to help. Cole injects Sam and himself, turning them into wolves. The helicopter catches up to them and Beck is killed. The pack splits when Shelby and Cole fight. Shelby attacks Cole but they are shot.

Isabel, who has driven up to the commotion, is hurt by Cole's apparent death and drives onto the scene. Her father texts her to leave, but she refuses The hunt stops and the wolves arrive safely.

Finally, Isabel discovers that her parents are sending her to California for ruining the hunt. Cole calls her and she is thrilled that he is alive. He admits that he needed to talk to her before he saw Sam and Grace. She tells him to keep her number, and they say goodbye.

Sinner
Cole travels to Los Angeles, California and visits Isabel, persuading her to agree to have dinner with him. In the day, Cole visits the home of Baby North, owner of the web TV show SharpT33th, before he begins starring in her NARKOTIKA based reality show.

Baby visits Isabel later in the day and proposes that she should star alongside Cole. The discovery that Cole did not come to California to find her, but instead to return to the spot light, devastates Isabel. She refuses to be on the show, calling Cole to accuse him of lying to her, before telling him to drop dead.

Cole begins living in the house supplied by Baby alongside the three-member band she had arranged. Cameras are sewn throughout the house, with a camera crew to match. After rejecting the guitarist and bassist chosen for him, he decidedly informs Baby's that he shall conduct the auditions himself. Isabel calls Cole and tells him she will go out for breakfast with him instead.

Isabel joins Cole at his house for breakfast, which they eat in the bathroom, the only place out of reach from the cameras. Their date is interrupted by a phone call from Baby, informing him that preparations have been made to host the auditions on the beach, as he had requested. Isabel refuses to join him.

Cole calls his old band member Jeremy Shutt, wanting him to return to playing bass for him. Already playing bass for a new band, he agrees to come to the auditions, but only to help Cole to choose his successor. After the auditions have finished, Cole unsuccessful in his search of a new bassist, Jeremy finally agrees to join NARKOTIKA again. Isabel watches the first episode online.

In between going on dates with Isabel and transforming into a werewolf in his bathroom, Cole begins writing NARKOTIKA's new album. Baby's attempts to sabotage him fall short, as Isabel and his secret transformations into a wolf help him maintain his sanity and sobriety.

Isabel arrives at a birthday party arranged for Cole, finding him smelling of alcohol and with a girl hanging off him. In the parking lot she accuses him of being drunk, before telling him to never call her again. Cole returns to the party, where he receives his birthday present: a reunion with his Mustang that he had been wanting, and the reunion with his parents that he had not.

After some words of advice from his friend, Leon, and a phone call to Grace, Cole takes his parents out for dinner. Later, while performing, Cole is punched by his ex-band member's sister who appears from the crowd. He is then taken to Jeremy's house to get cleaned up. After seeing the happiness Jeremy has surrounded himself with, Cole decides to show his genuine self. Eventually, he and Isabel begin dating, finally announcing their love for each other decidedly in front of the cameras.

Major characters

Grace Brisbane
When she is saved from the wolves as a child by Sam, she begins to feel a deep connection with him. After meeting Sam in his human form, she falls in love with him and they begin dating.  She returns to help move the wolves and considers undergoing bacterial meningitis to become human again at the end of Forever so that she can go to college. She has dirty blonde hair and is the most beautiful girl Sam has ever seen; John Marx, the brother of Grace's close friend Olivia Marx, would also call her "good looking" as a pet name.

Sam Roth
Geoffrey Beck adopted Sam at age 11, after his birth parents tried to kill him after discovering he had become a werewolf. He met Grace and they begin dating, gradually falling in love. Isabel injects him with bacterial meningitis as a possible cure, but he disappears into the woods after transforming. He later returns as a human, revealing the cure had worked. After Grace disappears, he vows to find her again. When the wolves are under threat, he is injected so that he can turn into a wolf again to help move them into a safer location. He often puts his feelings into lyrics, becoming human again at the end of Forever. He has a dark mop of hair and yellow eyes; Cole describes him as being a yellow-eyed John Lennon and Grace thinks he looks everything but nothing like his wolf form at the same time.

Isabel Culpeper
Her character was introduced as being Jack's sister in Shiver, and she later becomes a narrator in Linger, Forever and Sinner. She moved to Mercy Falls from California when she was 14. After discovering that Jack was a werewolf, she helped Grace with Sam, growing very close to her. Isabel suggested bacterial meningitis as a cure. This killed Jack but saved Sam. Although originally portrayed as a cold person, Isabel begins to show her softer side, especially in her friendship with Grace. Isabel begins an on-off relationship with werewolf Cole. Isabel stops a wolf hunt by refusing to leave the scene, resulting in her being sent back to California. When Cole called her to say goodbye, having fallen in love with her, she told him to keep her number. Grace says that Isabel has is very good looking, typical of a Culpeper, and Cole describes her as being drop dead gorgeous the first time he sees her. She has blue eyes and blonde hair, though her long ringlets are cut short and jagged at the start of Linger.

Cole St Clair
Cole was turned into a wolf by Beck along with Victor and an unknown girl. He was introduced in Linger and was a narrator for Linger, Forever and Sinner. After attacking Shelby, he was almost killed. He was also the one to discover that it was adrenaline, not temperature, to trigger a transformation. Because of his father's doctor career, he managed to find injections that could influence transformation. He has brown hair and green eyes, described by Isabel and Grace as being very good looking. Cole is the lead singer of the famous band NARKOTIKA.

Shelby
Shelby is a troubled werewolf in the pack who was sexually abused in her human life. She was a narrator in Forever. Feeling sorry for her, Beck turned her. As a wolf, she was supposedly the dominant female. However, she was infatuated with Sam and wanted him to be beside her (as he would have been the dominant male), often trying to kill Sam's girlfriend, Grace, of whom she was jealous. She was the one to turn Jack and kill Olivia. After attacking Cole, both of them are shot, but only Shelby dies. She had white blonde hair and Grace called her "beautiful with deep, soulful eyes"; she also has a strong southern accent.

Film adaptation
Shiver had been considered for film adaptation by Paramount Pictures, although creative differences meant the project was not continued. Maggie Stiefvater has stated that she has not completely disregarded the option to adapt the first novel of the series into a film, but has stated that it shall not be occurring in the near future. Believing that the film industry would limit her power over the production of Shiver's movie counterpart, she has also stated that she would prefer for there to be no movie made.

Recognition

Shiver
Indies Choice Book Award Finalist ALA Best Books for Young Adults
ALA Quick Pick for Reluctant Readers
2011 ALA Popular Paperbacks for Young Adults
Amazon Top Ten Books for Teens
Border's Original Voices Pick & Finalist
Barnes & Noble 2009 Top Twenty Books for Teens
CBC Children's Choice Awards Finalist
SIBA 2010 Book Award Finalist
Glamour's Best Book to Curl Up With
Winner, 2010 Midwest Booksellers’ Choice Award for Children's Literature
Winner of the 2011 Georgia Peach Award  
VOYA: The Perfect Tens
YALSA Teens’ Top Ten
Silver Inky Award Winner (Australia)
CO Blue Spruce Young Adult Book Award Nominees 2011
FL Teens Read Award Nominees 2010-2011
MD Black-Eyed Susan (High School) Book Award Nominees 2010-2011
NC YA Book Award Booklist (High School) 2010-2011  
NH Flume Teen Reader's Choice Award Nominees (9-12) 2011  
The New York Times Bestseller #8 in Young Adult
OR Young Adult Network Book Rave Reading List 2010  
PA Young Reader's Choice Award Nominees (Young Adult) 2010-2011  
TN Volunteer State Award Nominees Young Adult (7-12) 2011-2012  
2011 NCSLMA Young Adult Book Award Nominee (North Carolina)
2010-2011 Pennsylvania Young Reader's Choice Award Nominee  
2010 TAYSHAS Reading List (Texas)

Linger
 Debuted at #1 on The New York Times Bestseller List 
USA Today Bestseller 
Wall Street Journal Bestseller 
ABA Bestseller
L.A. Times Bestseller 
Junior Library Guild Selection

Forever
The New York Times Bestseller 
Amazon's Best Books of the Month, July 2011

See also

References

External links
 

Book series introduced in 2009
Fantasy novel trilogies
Young adult romance literature
Romance novel series